Santos Football Club is a Jamaican football club, which currently plays in the second level KSAFA Super League.

The team is based in Kingston, Jamaica.

History
Founded on April 16, 1964 by former Jamaica national team coach, Winston Chung Fah, the name and symbol of the team are a tribute to Pelé's Santos FC of Brazil. Also, the team colors are in honor of the Brazilian national team.

The team has won the Jamaica National Premier League on 5 separate occasions: in the 1973–74, 1974–75, 1975–76, 1976–77 and 1979–80 seasons.

References

External links
 

 http://jamaica-star.com/thestar/20090505/sports/sports5.html

Football clubs in Jamaica
Association football clubs established in 1964
1964 establishments in Jamaica